Tonido is remote access and home server software for network-attached storage. Once installed on a computer, Tonido software makes that computer's files available remotely via the internet through the web browser or through native mobile apps.  This allows access to files stored on the computer, including music and videos, to any computing device connected to the Internet in possession of login credentials. Data is by default transmitted via Tonido's servers, with no port forwarding required, but can be transmitted without using Tonido's servers by setting up port forwarding. Data transfer speed cannot exceed that of the slowest link in the data path, including USB 2.0 for USB-connected storage.

Tonido stores all user information including login credentials locally, enabling login into Tonido software without the requirement of an internet connection.

Tonido allows different computing devices to synchronise files via a Tonido server, without using the public computing "cloud". Synchronisation uses Tonido's servers; the company provides 2 GB of synchronised storage free of charge, and 100 GB for Pro users.

Tonido runs on x86, ARM, PowerPC and MIPS architectures, and is available as binary packages for popular Linux distributions such as  Ubuntu, Fedora, and OpenSUSE, and for Mac OS X and Windows.

Tonido sell a small computer that runs Tonido software. The TonidoPlug is based on the SheevaPlug, running Ubuntu Linux.

References

External links 
 

Linux-based devices
Computer storage devices
File sharing software for Linux
Home servers